PS Penajam Paser Utara or Persatuan Sepakbola Penajam Paser Utara (en: Football Association of Penajam North Paser) or simple PS PPU is an Indonesian football club based in Penajam North Paser Regency, East Kalimantan. Club played in Liga 3.

References

External links
Liga-Indonesia.co.id

Penajam North Paser Regency
Football clubs in East Kalimantan
Football clubs in Indonesia